À L’Olympia is a live album, and DVD, by French electronic musician Émilie Simon, released in February 2007.  It includes songs from all of her albums. The album contains material taken from a concert in September 2006 at the Olympia. The DVD contains footage of the making of the album, a video produced by her in Japan for “Dame de lotus”, and all her three music videos to date.

Track listing

CD
Dame De Lotus
Fleur De Saison
Rose Hybride De Thé
In The Lake
Sweet Blossom
Swimming
Opium
Le Vieil Amant
Ice Girl
I Wanna Be Your Dog
Song Of The Storm
Never Fall In Love
Désert
Alicia
En Cendres
My Old Friend
Graines D’Étoiles
Flowers
Come As You Are

Opendisc tracks
Annie
All Is White

DVD
[intro]
Dame de lotus
Fleur de saison
Rose hybride de thé
In the lake
Sweet blossom
Annie
Swimming
Opium
Le vieil amant
Ice girl
All is white
I wanna be your dog
Never fall in love
Désert
Alicia
En cendres
Graines d’étoiles
My old friend
Flowers
Come as you are

Charts

Album

References

Émilie Simon albums
Albums recorded at the Olympia (Paris)
2007 live albums
2007 video albums
Live video albums